Iris graminea is a species of flowering plant belonging to the subgenus Limniris of the genus Iris, in particular the series Spuriae. It is a rhizomatous perennial, with purple or violet blue flowers almost hidden by narrow, grass-like leaves, and a plum scented fragrance. It is cultivated as an ornamental plant in temperate regions. It has several common names, including grass-leaved flag, grass leaved iris, plum iris and plum tart iris (due to its scent). This species naturally occurs in the southern half of Europe, from Spain and France in the West to Russia and the Caucasus in the East.

Description
Iris graminea has slender, short, hard rhizomes. They can have many branches creating dense tufts, clumps or tussocks of plants.

The flower has bright purple flowers, and shiny, green leaves. Some plants can have dark green leaves. They have strongly, visible longitudinal veins. The leaves are longer than the flowering stems. After the plant has flowered, the foliage has the tendency to extend. Later, the deciduous foliage dies back during the winter.

The stems have 1–2 spathes (leaves of the flower bud), which are unequal in size. The lower is larger and rather leaf-like. The stems hold 1–2 terminal (top of stem) flowers, blooming in spring and summer, between May and June. The stems are normally, unbranched, but (if they have a second flower), the pedicel, is up to 6 cm long.

It has 2 pairs of petals, 3 large sepals (outer petals), known as the 'falls' and 3 inner, smaller petals (or tepals, known as the 'standards'. The falls have a long haft or claw, (section closest to the stem) and a small rounded or oval blade. The centre of the blade has a pale yellow, or white central area, which is veined with violet, purple, or blue. Some references describe a dark purple area with white veining. The claw is sometimes winged, and tinged with green or brown, or veined deep reddish-purple. It has a long and arching, purple style branch, (that is long as the haft), and has a dark purple centre stripe. They have a brown base.

It has an ovary with double ridges, a 2 pointed stigma and pollen that is orange-red. It also has a short perianth tube. Inside the capsule, are pear shaped seeds, which are slightly compressed and flattened.

The flower has been described as having a fruity scent.

Genetics
As most irises are diploid, having two sets of chromosomes. This can be used to identify hybrids and classification of groupings.
It has been counted several times including, 2n=34, Simonet 1932; 2n=34, Lenz 1963; 2n=34, Popova, M., & I. Cesmedziev, (1975 & 1976); 2n=34, Colasante & Sauer, 1993; 2n=28, 34, 36, Lovka, 1995 and 2n=34, Dobeš et al., 1997.
It is generally published as 2n=34.

Taxonomy
It is known as Iris à feuilles de graminées or Iris de Bayonne  in France, and Giaggiolo susino in Italy. It is known as kosaciec trawolistny in Polish, and Iris trávolistý in Czech and Slovak. and it is known as zlakovidny iris in Russia, and gräsiris in Swedish,(meaning grass iris).

The Latin specific epithet graminea refers to grassy due to the grass-like leaves. It has common names of Grass-Leaved Flag (in the US) or Grass leaved Iris, Plum Iris, and Plum tart Iris, or Plum scented Iris, (because of the scent).

It was originally published and described by Carl Linnaeus in Species Plantarum Vol.1 page39 on 1 May 1753. It was later published by Ker-Gawler in Curtis's Botanical Magazine Vol.18 page681 in 1803. Then by B. Fedtsch in Flora of SSSR Vol.4 page529 in 1935. It was verified by United States Department of Agriculture Agricultural Research Service on 4 April 2003 and then updated on 1 December 2004. It is an accepted name by the RHS, and it gained the RHS's Award of Garden Merit.

Distribution
It is native to temperate areas of Europe, and Asia.

It is widespread from Spain to Russia. Within Asia, it is found in the Caucasus regions, of Georgia, and the Russian Federation, (in Ciscaucasia and Dagestan). Also in Turkey (in Asia Minor). Within Europe, it is found in Austria, Bulgaria, the Czech Republic and Slovakia, (in Moravia), ex-Yugoslavia, France, Germany, Hungary, Italy, Poland, Romania, Spain, Switzerland, and Ukraine, (in Crimea,). It may be naturalized in the Moravia region of the Czech Republic, and in Germany.

Habitat
It is found growing in scrubland, in grass lands, in meadows (or pastures), in open woods, and in rocky or gravelly soils of the mountains.

Conservation
I. graminea is an 'endangered species' in the Czech Republic and Slovakia, it is also listed as 'vulnerable' in Hungary. Within Saxony (Germany), it is listed as rare. I. graminea is thought to be extinct in Poland, but was formerly found near Cieszyn. It has been listed in various Red Data Books.

Cultivation

I. graminea is hardy to between USDA Zones 3 to 9. It is hardy to Europe Zone H2. It can survive temperatures as low as −20 °C. It is hardy in most places of the UK. During the winter, the foliage dies back, leaving the rhizome under the ground. In very cold climates, a mulch may help the plant survive colder temperatures.

It can be grown in normal garden conditions.
They prefer neutral or slightly acidic, (or lime-free), well drained, and fertile (or humus rich) soils. They can tolerate dry soils, or clay and heavy soils, but it prefers damp soils. They prefer positions in full sun, and can tolerate partial shade. It requires adequate watering during growth, such as a moist spring and then drier during the summer. Mature plants can tolerate drought periods.

It can be fertilized in early spring and after flowers have bloomed. They can be grown in a front of a mixed border, or rockery. As well as being naturalized in the garden, they can be also grown in containers, as long as they are well watered. The flowers can be used in bouquets, so can also be grown in a cutting garden. They do not like root disturbance, similar to other spuria irises.

It suffers from no serious insect or disease problems. Crown rot is an infrequently occurring disease problem. It is susceptible to certain viruses, such as bacterial leaf blight, soft rot,  rhizome rot, leaf spot, rust, viruses and scorch. It is also can be susceptible to damage by Iris borer, verbina bud moth, white flies, iris weevil, thrips, slugs, snails, aphids and nematodes. It can also tolerate damage from deer. Aphid Aphis newtoni can be found on the plant.

The iris has been cultivated since at least 1568. It was first grown in Cambridge Botanic Garden in 1733, where it was labelled as narrow leafed plum scent iris. For many years it was grown in St. Petersburg Botanical Garden, and the botanical garden of Ufa.

It is the most commonly grown Iris spuria species, and can be easily found in plants nurseries, though it is most commonly known in Europe.

Propagation
It can also be propagated by division or by seed growing. It rarely needs lifting and dividing. Large clumps of mature plants can be lifted between mid-summer to early autumn, then divided before being replanted. As it does not like root disturbance, so seed growing is preferred. If re-planted, they can take a year to 'settle' before beginning to bloom again.

Seeds are collected from the pods after flowering. Seeds are then sown in containers in a cold frame in autumn, or between September to May. Seeds should be kept moist for about 2–4 weeks and also warm (at about 15–20 °C). Then temperatures between −4 °C and + 4 °C suspend for 4–6 weeks. These conditions are best reached at the autumn sowing outdoors. Seed trays should then be kept at temperatures of 5 °C to + 10 °C after the cooling period, for a few weeks. In the wild, these freezing and heat period) conditions take place naturally. The plants need to grow and mature for about 2–3 years before they begin to flower.

Hybrids and cultivars
Iris graminea has the following known varieties: 'Achtaroffii', 'Adami', 'Colchica', 'Graminea Lamprophylla', 'Graminea Sylvatica', 'Graminea latifolia', 'Gravenia', 'Hort's variety', and 'Pseudocyperus'. The latter of these has ranges from the Czech Republic, Romania, and Slovakia. Pseudocyperus has broad leaves, but no scent.

References

Sources
 

Komarov, V. L. et al., eds. 1934–1964. Flora SSSR.
Tutin, T. G. et al., eds. 1964–1980. Flora Europaea.

External links
 BioLib
 Iris graminea

graminea
Flora of Europe
Flora of the Caucasus
Garden plants of Europe
Plants described in 1753
Taxa named by Carl Linnaeus